The Bhopal–Bilaspur Mahanadi Express was a train which ran between Bhopal, the capital city of Madhya Pradesh and Bilaspur, a major city in Chhattisgarh. The train numbered as 18225 and 18226. It was named for an important river of the state called Mahanadi.

Route

AC 2, AC 3 and sleeper coaches were available in this train.

It ran on a triweekly basis from both the sites and its rake was shared by Amarkantak Express which used to run on a triweekly basis via JabalpurJunction. Later, in 2005, this train was cancelled and the Amarkantak Express was made daily.

References
 

Transport in Bhopal
Transport in Bilaspur, Chhattisgarh
Rail transport in Chhattisgarh
Rail transport in Madhya Pradesh
Defunct trains in India